Pikkjärve (also known as Vissi) is a village in Valga Parish, Valga County, in southeastern Estonia, located about 14 km east of the bordertown Valga. It has a population of 27 (as of 1 January 2004).

The currently inactive Valga–Pechory railway passes Pikkjärve on its northern side, there's a station named "Mürgi".

References

Villages in Valga County
Kreis Werro